Stephen Emil Fabian Sr. is an American artist.

Career
Fabian specializes in science fiction and fantasy illustration and cover art for books and magazines. Fabian also produced artwork for TSR's Dungeons & Dragons game from 1986 to 1995, particularly on the Ravenloft line. He was self-taught, two of his primary influences being Virgil Finlay and Hannes Bok. His work is usually signed Stephen Fabian or Stephen E. Fabian.

Fabian was a recipient of the World Fantasy Award for Life Achievement in 2006. He has also been a two-time nominee for the Hugo Award for Best Fan Artist (1970 and 1971), and a seven-time nominee for the Hugo Award for Best Professional Artist (1975–1981). Collections of his work include Ladies & Legends (1993) and Stephen E. Fabian's Women & Wonders (1995).

Works

Roleplaying games
Van Richten's Guide to Ghosts (1992)

References

External links
 Stephen Fabian's website

 

American illustrators
American speculative fiction artists
Fantasy artists
Living people
Role-playing game artists
Science fiction artists
Year of birth missing (living people)